Lukova may refer to:

Luková, a municipality and village in the Czech Republic
Lukovë, a municipality and village in Albania
Feminine form of the Bulgarian surname Lukov